Lefeaver is a surname. Notable people with the surname include:

John Lefeaver (1817–1879), English cricketer
Stephen Lefeaver (1791–1867), English cricketer